Spurius Carvilius C. f. C. n., later surnamed Maximus, was the first member of the plebeian gens Carvilia to obtain the consulship, which he held in 293 BC, and again in 272 BC.

Early career
Born of equestrian rank, Carvilius served as curule aedile in 299 BC, and six years later entered upon his first consulship with Lucius Papirius Cursor.  They met with great success against the Samnites, with Carvilius taking Amiternum, Cominium, Palumbinum, and Herculaneum.  Carvilius was then sent into Etruria, where the Falisci had broken the peace.  He took the town of Troilium and five other fortified locations, defeated the Faliscan army, and granted them peace in exchange for a large fine.

Returning to Rome, Carvilius celebrated a triumph, distributed much of the booty he had captured to his soldiers, paid 380,000 pounds of bronze into the treasury, and used the remainder to pay for the erection of a temple to Fors Fortuna.  Using bronze armor taken from the Samnites, he had a colossal statue of Jupiter built on the Capitol, which was said to be so tall that it could be seen from the temple on the Alban Mount.  According to legend, enough bronze fell from the statue during its polishing, that Carvilius had a statue of himself cast from it and placed at the feet of the colossus.

The following year, Carvilius was appointed Legatus to the consul Decimus Junius Brutus, who had no military experience.  The historian Marcus Velleius Paterculus also states that Carvilius held the office of censor, probably in 289 BC.

Second consulship
Carvilius was elected consul a second time in 272 BC, together with his former colleague, Lucius Papirius Cursor, in hopes that they would bring the war with the Samnites to an end before Pyrrhus could return to Italy.  Although the details of the war were not recorded, the consuls defeated the Samnites, Lucani, Bruttii, and Tarentines, and celebrated a second triumph.

Carvilius was the father of Spurius Carvilius Maximus Ruga, consul in 234 and 228 BC.

See also
 Carvilia (gens)

Footnotes

Maximus, Spurius
3rd-century BC Roman consuls
Roman censors
Ancient Roman generals
Roman aediles
Senators of the Roman Republic
Politicians from Rome